The 2020 FIA World Cup for Cross-Country Bajas is the second season of the reformed FIA World Cup for Cross-Country Bajas; an annual competition for baja-style rally raid events for cars, buggies, and side-by-sides held in multiple countries.

Calendar
The initial calendar for the 2020 world cup featured eight cross-country baja events. Some events on the schedule are shared with the 2020 FIM Bajas World Cup.
Due to COVID-19 pandemic, the calendar suffered several changes.

Regulation Changes
Starting with the 2020 season the vehicle classes have been reorganized into the following classifications:
T1.1 - 4x4 Prototype Cross-Country Vehicles - Petrol and Diesel
T1.2 - 4x2 Prototype Cross-Country Vehicles - Petrol and Diesel
T2 - Series Production Cross Country Vehicles
T3 - Improved Lightweight Prototypes Cross Country Vehicles
T4 - Improved Lightweight Series Side by Side Cross Country Vehicles

The FIA awards the world cup to drivers, co-drivers, and teams competing in the T1 category; whilst drivers and teams in the T3 and T4 categories are awarded FIA cups. The T2 production class will no longer be awarded an end of season trophy.

Notable teams and drivers

Results

Overall

T2 category

T3 category

T4 category

Championship standings
In order to score points in the Cup classifications, competitors must register with the FIA before the entry closing date of the first rally entered.
Points system
 Points for final positions are awarded as per the following table:

For the 2020 season points will be awarded to the top three finishing positions of each leg on each event. These points will only be awarded if the driver finishes in the overall classification of each event. If they do not then no leg points are awarded, but the following vehicles will not move up a position for leg points.

Competitors were awarded with reduced points at the Baja Portalegre 500, which was shortened.

FIA World Cup for Drivers, Co-Drivers, and Teams

Drivers' championship

A total of 33 drivers scored points.

Co-Drivers' championship

A total of 35 co-drivers scored points.

Teams' championship

A total of 29 teams scored points.

FIA T3 Cup for Drivers

A total of 13 drivers scored points.

FIA T4 Cup for Drivers and Teams

Drivers' championship

Teams championship

References

External links 
 

Cross Country Rally World Cup
World Cup for Cross-Country Bajas
Motorsport events postponed due to the COVID-19 pandemic